HMS Ambush (P418/S68/S18), was an Amphion-class submarine of the Royal Navy, built by Vickers Armstrong and launched 24 September 1945.

In 1948 she took part in trials of the submarine snorkel. In 1951 she heard and decoded a distress message from HMS Affray, which was sunk with the ultimate loss of all 75 hands. In 1953 she took part in the Fleet Review to celebrate the Coronation of Queen Elizabeth II.

Design
Like all Amphion-class submarines, Ambush had a displacement of  when at the surface and  while submerged. The submarine was powered by two Admiralty ML eight-cylinder diesel engines generating a power of  each. It also contained four electric motors each producing  that drove two shafts.

Ambush was fitted with ten  torpedo tubes, one QF 4 inch naval gun Mk XXIII, one Oerlikon 20 mm cannon, and a .303 British Vickers machine gun. Its torpedo tubes were fitted to the bow and stern, and it could carry twenty torpedoes. Its complement was sixty-one crew members.

Construction
Ambush was laid down at Vickers Armstrong's Barrow-in-Furness shipyard on 17 May 1945, was launched on 24 September 1945 and completed on 22 July 1947.

Service
On commissioning, Ambush joined the 3rd Submarine Flotilla based at Rothesay, Scotland. The early post-war years saw the Royal Navy introduce the submarine snorkel (known as the Snort in British service), with a number of trials carried out on extended submarine operations using the snort in various weather conditions. Ambush set out from Rothesay on 10 February 1948 on an extended submerged cruise in Arctic waters between Jan Mayen and Bear Island. The submarine encountered a severe storm, which forced Ambush to the surface as she could not maintain depth control well enough to use the snort, returning to base on 18 March.

Ambush joined the 10 Submarine Flotilla based at Singapore in November 1959 and remained based in the Far East until 25 July 1967.

Decommissioning and disposal
Following decommissioning, she was sold to Thos. W. Ward and arrived at Inverkeithing for breaking up on 5 July 1971.

References

External links
 Entry at uboat.net
 Pictures at maritimequest.net

 

Amphion-class submarines
Cold War submarines of the United Kingdom
Ships built in Barrow-in-Furness
1945 ships